Protaphreutis borboniella is a moth of the family Tineidae. It is found on Réunion, Madagascar and Mauritius.

See also
 List of moths of Réunion
 List of moths of Madagascar
 List of moths of Mauritius

References

Tineidae
Moths described in 1833
Moths of Africa